Jeffrey Lance "Jeff" Cothran (born June 28, 1971) is a former American football fullback in the National Football League (NFL) and Arena Football League (AFL). He played for the Cincinnati Bengals, Orlando Predators, Detroit Fury and Florida Bobcats.

External links
Just Sports Stats

1971 births
Living people
Sportspeople from Middletown, Ohio
Players of American football from Ohio
American football fullbacks
Ohio State Buckeyes football players
Cincinnati Bengals players
Orlando Predators players
Detroit Fury players
Florida Bobcats players
Sportspeople from the Cincinnati metropolitan area